Carales astur, the astur moth, is a moth of the family Erebidae. It was described by Pieter Cramer in 1777. It is found from Mexico to Bolivia and east to Suriname.

Subspecies
Carales astur astur (Suriname)
Carales astur cubensis (Rothschild, 1909) (Cuba)

References

Phaegopterina
Moths of North America
Moths of Central America
Moths of South America
Moths described in 1777